The 2009 season was the Baltimore Ravens' 14th in the National Football League (NFL). The franchise entered the season off an 11–5 record in their previous season, a playoff berth, but a loss in the American Football Conference (AFC) Championship game against the eventual Super Bowl XLIII champions, the Pittsburgh Steelers. The Ravens recorded nine victories to seven losses, although they were unable to win the AFC North division title. However, due to various playoff clinching scenarios in the AFC, the Ravens were able to clinch a wild card berth against the Oakland Raiders in Week 17. As the sixth seed in the AFC for the second straight year, they defeated the third seeded New England Patriots in Foxboro in the AFC Wild Card playoffs, handing Tom Brady's first ever playoff loss at home and New England's first home playoff loss since 1978. They, however, lost in the AFC Divisional playoffs against the top seeded and eventual AFC Champion Indianapolis Colts; with this loss, the 2009 season came to an end for the Ravens. For head coach John Harbaugh, this was his second year with the franchise, compiling an overall record of 20–12 in the regular season.

Offseason
Rex Ryan, a longtime fixture on the Ravens' sidelines, departed for New York to become the New York Jets head coach after the Ravens fell to the Steelers in the 2008 AFC Championship game.

Other notable offseason departures include linebacker Bart Scott and safety Jim Leonhard, both of whom left Baltimore to follow Rex Ryan to New York, and longtime placekicker Matt Stover. On March 5, 2009, Stover told reporters that the Ravens were "going in a different direction." When Stover's tenure ended with the Ravens, the team severed ties with one of its two remaining players from the Ravens' first season in 1996; the other being Ray Lewis.

2009 NFL Draft
The Baltimore Ravens had six selections going into the 2009 NFL Draft, which was held in Radio City Music Hall in New York City, New York on April 25 and April 26, 2009.

Roster

Opening training camp roster

Week 1 roster

Final roster

Staff

Schedule

Preseason

Regular season
The 2009 NFL schedule was released on April 14, 2009.

Note: Intra-division opponents are in bold text.

Postseason

Division standings

Game summaries

Regular season

Week 1: vs. Kansas City Chiefs

The Baltimore Ravens began the 2009 season at home for the second season in a row. They hosted the Kansas City Chiefs, who struggled to a franchise-worst 2–14 record in 2008. The Ravens dominated time of possession and offensive production throughout the game, but their special teams miscues made the game much closer than the score would indicate. The Ravens found the end zone halfway through the first quarter for their first touchdown of the season when Flacco found Willis McGahee for a 3-yard touchdown pass. The Ravens would later increase their advantage with a Stephen Hauschka field goal. In the second quarter, a special teams miscue led to Chiefs safety Jon McGraw blocking a Sam Koch punt into the end zone, where he recovered for a touchdown. Early in the third quarter, Derrick Johnson intercepted an errant Joe Flacco pass and returned it to the Ravens 3-yard line. Chiefs quarterback Brodie Croyle found standout receiver Dwayne Bowe for a touchdown three plays later. The Ravens would respond with an 11-play, five-minute drive capped off by a 9-yard touchdown to Todd Heap. After trading touchdowns halfway through the fourth quarter, the Ravens defense forced a turnover on downs and their offense capitalized with a 1-yard touchdown run by Le'Ron McClain. McGahee added an additional touchdown for the Ravens in the final minute of the game to open their season with a 38–24 win, their second successful home opener in a row. With the win, not only do the Ravens improve to 1–0, they are the only team in the AFC North to win their home opener on Kickoff Sunday; the Pittsburgh Steelers defeated the Tennessee Titans 13–10 on Kickoff Night the Thursday prior.

Week 2: at San Diego Chargers

The Chargers host the Ravens in their home debut in San Diego after a narrow escape in the second of two AFL 50th Anniversary-themed division rivalry Monday Night matchups against the Raiders in Oakland. The Chargers jumped out to an early lead when a blown coverage led to an easy 81-yard touchdown pass from Philip Rivers to Darren Sproles. The Ravens answered with Willis McGahee on a 5-yard touchdown run, but the Chargers would increase their advantage on a Nate Kaeding field goal. The offensive display would continue in the second quarter, but the Ravens touchdowns were only answered by Chargers field goals. McGahee found the end zone a second time to take the lead 14–10, but the Chargers pulled within one on the second Kaeding field goal. Flacco then found Kelley Washington for Flacco's first touchdown pass of the day and Washington's first touchdown reception as a Raven just inside the 2-minute halftime warning. Rivers led the Chargers down the field in an attempt to answer, but the drive stalled and had to settle for the third of four Kaeding field goals. In the second half, both defenses stiffened. Todd Heap would get his second touchdown catch of the season from Flacco from 9 yards out, but the Chargers responded with a 35-yard touchdown catch from Vincent Jackson. Late in the fourth quarter, interceptions from Flacco and Rivers led to trading field goals. After a Ravens punt, Rivers led the Chargers all the way down to the Ravens 15. The Chargers went for the first down on fourth down to go for the win, but Sproles was stopped by Ray Lewis five yards in the backfield, allowing the Ravens to run the clock out. With the win, not only do the Ravens improve to 2–0, the Ravens take sole possession of first place in the AFC North with the Steelers' loss to the Bears.

Week 3: vs. Cleveland Browns

After another high scoring affair in San Diego, the Ravens returned to Baltimore with a one-game lead on the Steelers and Bengals and hosted their first AFC North Division game against the Cleveland Browns. (Coincidentally, the Bengals host the Steelers in divisional play in Week 3 as well.) Although this was the third consecutive high-scoring game for the Ravens, this was not a close contest. The Ravens struck early on the first of two touchdown runs from Willis McGahee and increased their advantage on a Hauschka field goal. In the second quarter, after another Hauschka field goal, McGahee found the end zone again. His second rushing touchdown leads the NFL with five. Although the Browns wanted to prove they were up to the challenge of contending with a quality football team, miscues thoroughly undid the Browns as quarterbacks Derek Anderson and Brady Quinn combined for four interceptions. Quinn was benched at the half in favor of Anderson, but Anderson was no better than his maligned counterpart. The third quarter only saw another touchdown for the Ravens, but was a special one for Ray Rice, as it was his first career NFL touchdown. The final minutes of the third quarter also saw the Browns' longest drive of the day, but as time expired in the third quarter, the Browns were stopped short of the end zone. The fourth quarter opened with the Browns' only points of the game on a field goal from Billy Cundiff, a free-agent signee since kicker Phil Dawson was inactive due to a leg injury. The final points of the contest came on the third Anderson interception, which was Ed Reed's first of the season. Flacco's touchdown was not only the longest of the season for him to date, but was the only passing touchdown all day. He hit a wide-open Derrick Mason after a blown coverage in the Browns secondary for a 72-yard touchdown. With the win, the Ravens improve to 3–0 and improve to 1–0 in the AFC North.

Week 4: at New England Patriots

Coming off their divisional home win over the Browns, the Ravens flew to Gillette Stadium for a Week 4 battle with the New England Patriots. After Patriots kicker Stephen Gostkowski got a 32-yard field goal in the first quarter, Baltimore got into the game with quarterback Joe Flacco hooking up with wide receiver Derrick Mason on a 20-yard touchdown pass. In the second quarter, New England came back with quarterback Tom Brady's 1-yard touchdown run and running back Sammy Morris' 12-yard touchdown run.

The Ravens would reply in the third quarter with defensive end Terrell Suggs sacking Brady, causing a fumble which rolled into the Patriots' endzone, where defensive end Dwan Edwards would land on it for a touchdown. New England would come right back with Brady's 14-yard touchdown pass to wide receiver Randy Moss. Baltimore would play some catch-up in the fourth quarter as Flacco found running back Willis McGahee on a 13-yard touchdown pass, but the Patriots willingly replied with Gostkowski's 33-yard field goal. Flacco would lead a last-minute drive, but New England's stiffened and came away with the win.

With the tough loss, the Ravens fell to 3–1.

Week 5: vs. Cincinnati Bengals

Hoping to rebound from their tough road loss to the Patriots, the Ravens went home for a Week 5 AFC North duel with the Cincinnati Bengals. The winner would take the lead in the division after five weeks.

After a scoreless first quarter, Baltimore's defense went to work in the second quarter with safety Ed Reed returning an interception 52 yards for a touchdown. The Bengals would answer with a 32-yard field goal from kicker Shayne Graham. Near the end of the third quarter, Cincinnati would take the lead on a 28-yard touchdown run from running back Cedric Benson. The Ravens would respond in the fourth quarter as quarterback Joe Flacco hooked up with running back Ray Rice 48-yard touchdown pass. However, late in the game, the Bengals would deliver the final strike as quarterback Carson Palmer completed a 20-yard touchdown pass to wide receiver Andre Caldwell. Baltimore tried to rally, but an interception from cornerback Leon Hall eliminated any chance of a comeback.

With the loss, the Ravens fell to 3–2.

Also, the defense's 40-game streak of keeping a single rusher under 100 yards was snapped. The last time that Baltimore allowed a 100-yard rusher was Dec. 10, 2006 against the Chiefs' Larry Johnson.

Week 6: at Minnesota Vikings

Trying to snap a two-game losing streak, the Ravens flew to the Hubert H. Humphrey Metrodome for a Week 6 interconference duel with the Minnesota Vikings. Baltimore would trail in the first quarter as Vikings quarterback Brett Favre completed a 19-yard touchdown pass to tight end Visanthe Shiancoe and a 4-yard touchdown pass to wide receiver Bernard Berrian. Afterwards, the Ravens would snag the only points of the second quarter with kicker Stephen Hauschka making a 29-yard field goal.

In the third quarter, Minnesota would extend its lead as kicker Ryan Longwell nailed a 40-yard field goal. Baltimore would come right back into the game with running back Ray Rice's 22-yard touchdown run, but Longwell helped out the Vikings with a 22-yard field goal. In a nerve-wracking fourth quarter, Minnesota increased its lead with Favre finding Shiancoe again on a 1-yard touchdown run. The Ravens would respond with quarterback Joe Flacco's 32-yard touchdown pass to wide receiver Mark Clayton. After Longwell gave the Vikings a 29-yard field goal, Baltimore would take the lead as Flacco completed a 12-yard touchdown pass to wide receiver Derrick Mason and Rice getting a 33-yard touchdown run. Minnesota would regain the lead as Longwell booted a 31-yard field goal. Flacco would get the Ravens into scoring range, but Hauschka's 44-yard field goal attempt sailed wide left, preserving the Vikings' so-far perfect season.

With the loss, Baltimore went into its bye week at 3–3.

This also marked the first time that the Ravens defense allowed back-to-back 100-yard rushers since 2005 (Bengals' Rudi Johnson and Texans' Domanick Williams).

Week 8: vs. Denver Broncos

Coming off their bye week, the Ravens went home for a Week 8 duel with the undefeated Denver Broncos. Baltimore took flight in the first half with kicker Stephen Hauschka nailing a 43-yard field goal in the first quarter and a 35-yard field goal in the second quarter. The Ravens would immediately make their domination felt in the third quarter as rookie cornerback Lardarius Webb returned the second half's opening kickoff 95 yards for a touchdown. The Broncos would get on the board with running back Knowshon Moreno getting a 1-yard touchdown run, yet Baltimore answered with Hauschka booting a 31-yard field goal. Afterwards, the Ravens closed the game out in the fourth quarter as quarterback Joe Flacco found wide receiver Derrick Mason on a 20-yard touchdown pass, while running back Ray Rice got a 7-yard touchdown run.

With the win, Baltimore improved to 4–3.

Week 9: at Cincinnati Bengals

Coming off their dominating home win over the Broncos, the Ravens flew to Paul Brown Stadium for a Week 9 AFC North rematch with the Cincinnati Bengals. Baltimore would trail in the first quarter as Bengals quarterback Carson Palmer completed a 6-yard touchdown pass to wide receiver Andre Caldwell, followed by running back Cedric Benson getting a 1-yard touchdown run. Cincinnati would increase their lead in the second quarter as kicker Shayne Graham booted a 23-yard field goal. After a scoreless third quarter, the Ravens got on the board with a 2-yard touchdown run from running back Ray Rice. However, the Bengals' defense would stop any further progress from Baltimore.

With the loss, the Ravens fell to 4–4.

Week 10: at Cleveland Browns

Hoping to rebound from their season-sweeping losses to the Bengals, the Ravens flew to Cleveland Browns Stadium for a Week 10 Monday night duel with their AFC North rival, the Cleveland Browns. After a scoreless first half, Baltimore acquired all of their points in the third quarter. It began with running back Ray Rice getting a 13-yard touchdown run, safety Dawan Landry returning an interception 48 yards for a touchdown and kicker Stephen Hauschka booting a 44-yard field goal. Afterwards, the defense consistently shut down the Browns' inept offense.

With the win, the Ravens improved to 5–4.

Week 11: vs. Indianapolis Colts

Coming off their shutout road win over the Browns, the Ravens went home for a Week 11 duel with the Indianapolis Colts. Baltimore would trail in the first quarter as Colts quarterback Peyton Manning threw a 1-yard touchdown pass to tight end Dallas Clark. The Ravens would answer with recently signed kicker Billy Cundiff (after Stephen Hauschka was cut) making a 46-yard and a 44-yard field goal. Baltimore would take the lead in the second quarter with Cundiff's 38-yard field goal, but Indianapolis would answer with a 5-yard touchdown run from running back Joseph Addai. The Ravens would close out the half with Cundiff nailing a 36-yard field goal. After a scoreless third quarter, Baltimore regained the lead again in the fourth quarter with a 20-yard field goal from Cundiff, but the Colts would get the last laugh as former Ravens kicker Matt Stover booted a 25-yard field goal.

With the loss, Baltimore fell to 5–5.

Week 12: vs. Pittsburgh Steelers

Following a close loss to the Colts the prior week, the much-hated Steelers came to town for a rematch of last year's AFC Championship Game. Steelers starting QB Ben Roethlisberger, who suffered a concussion in the previous week's overtime loss to the Chiefs did not start and was the designated third-string quarterback. Backup Charlie Batch also was hurt in that game, which left second-year QB Dennis Dixon, who previously had one pass in his NFL career, to start. The Steelers received the opening kickoff, but went three-and-out. On the ensuing possession, the Ravens drove down the field with ease, capping off their drive with a touchdown run by Willis McGahee. In the second quarter, Dixon hit WR Santonio Holmes on a play-action pass for a 33-yard touchdown, tying the game. The Ravens answered on the following drive, with a 52-yard strike from Joe Flacco to Mark Clayton, setting up a 10-yard touchdown pass to Derrick Mason. In the third quarter, on the Ravens opening possession, Clayton made a 9-yard reception but fumbled the ball. The ball was kicked 20 yards towards the Steelers endzone by a Pittsburgh player, but recovered by Tyrone Carter. The Steelers drove, but were held to a field goal by Jeff Reed. Later in the fourth quarter, Joe Flacco was sacked by Lawrence Timmons and fumbled the ball, recovered by the Steelers near midfield. The drive resulted in a 24-yard run on a QB option by Dixon, giving the Steelers their first lead of the night. On the Ravens next possession, things were looking bad when the offense was facing a third-and-22 with around three minutes left. Joe Flacco completed a pass to Derrick Mason for 17 yards, leaving John Harbaugh with a critical decision. Harbaugh opted to go for it and Joe Flacco found Ray Rice for a 44-yard reception, setting the Ravens up inside the Steeler 10-yard line with less than 2 minutes left. Billy Cundiff tied the game with a 24-yard field goal. On the following Steeler possession, Dennis Dixon was nearly intercepted by Lardarius Webb. The Steelers were forced to punt, giving the ball back to the Ravens with about 1:30 left in the game. A very good punt return into Steeler territory by Chris Carr was wiped off by a block in the back. Despite the setback, the Ravens managed to drive to the Steeler 40-yard line, where their drive stalled. On third-and-9 with 25 seconds left, Joe Flacco was sacked and fumbled, but the ball was recovered by Ben Grubbs. With the clock counting inside 10 seconds left and no timeouts, the field goal team managed to get into formation and get the kick off. The 56-yard attempt by Billy Cundiff was dead center, but about 2 yards short. In overtime, the Steelers won the toss and got the ball, but were forced to punt. The Ravens, also forced to punt deep in their own territory, gave the ball to Pittsburgh around the Steeler 40-yard line. On a third-and-5, Dennis Dixon threw an interception to LB Paul Kruger, who returned the ball 26 yards to the Steeler 28-yard line. Already in field goal range, the Ravens ran the ball down to the Pittsburgh 11-yard line where Billy Cundiff made a 29-yard field goal to win the game.

With the win, both teams' records is 6–5. The Ravens hold the final wild card seed in the AFC due to the head-to-head tiebreaker over Pittsburgh.

Week 13: at Green Bay Packers

With injuries to Ed Reed and Mark Clayton, both the offense and defense failed to play up to standards and the team endured another painful defeat. With the loss, the Ravens fell to 6–6.

Week 14: vs Detroit Lions

With the win, the Ravens improved to 7–6 and allowed them outright second place in the AFC North with the Steelers' loss to the Browns. Also, the Ravens would set a record of most points scored in a single game until Week 10 of the 2012 season when they defeated the Raiders scoring 55 points against them.

Week 15: vs Chicago Bears

With the win, the Ravens improved to 8–6.

Week 16: at Pittsburgh Steelers

Even with the loss to the Steelers, the Ravens playoff hopes were not yet vanished. All the Ravens needed was a win the following against the Oakland Raiders to clinch a playoff berth. The loss dropped the team to 8–7.

Week 17: at Oakland Raiders

This victory allowed the dethroning of the defending world champion Pittsburgh Steelers and ending the latter team's run at a repeat title. In turn, the Ravens got their Wild Card spot.

Postseason

AFC Wild Card Round: at New England Patriots

Entering the postseason as the AFC's sixth seed, the Ravens began their playoff run at Gillette Stadium in the AFC Wild Card round against the #3 seeded New England Patriots. This game was a rematch of their game played during Week 4 of the 2009 season. The Ravens drew first blood as Ray Rice took the handoff from Flacco and ran through a hole in the defense on his way to an 83-yard touchdown on the first offensive play of the game. It was the longest rush of his career and the second longest rush in NFL postseason history. Less than two minutes later, LB and DE Terrell Suggs, forced a fumble from New England quarterback Tom Brady's hand on a third-and-11 pass attempt and recovered for the Ravens on the New England 17. Le'Ron McClain then capped a five-play Ravens scoring drive with a 2-yard touchdown plunge, extending the lead to 14–0. The Ravens capitalized on another New England miscue when cornerback Chris Carr intercepted a Tom Brady pass. After a 6-play, 26-yard drive, Ray Rice hopped into the end-zone for his second touchdown of the quarter. On the Patriots very next possession, another Tom Brady pass was intercepted by safety Ed Reed. Reed took the interception and returned it 25 yards before handing it off to Dawan Landry, who took it another 25 yards. This led to a Ravens field goal and a 24–0 first-quarter lead. The Ravens went on to defeat the Patriots by a final score of 33–14. The Ravens would advance to face the top-seeded Colts in the Divisional Round.

AFC Divisional Round: at Indianapolis Colts

Coming off their impressive road win over the Patriots in the Wild Card round, the Ravens flew to Lucas Oil Stadium for the AFC Divisional Round against the top-seeded Indianapolis Colts. Baltimore would trail to begin the first quarter as former Ravens kicker Matt Stover got a 44-yard field goal. The Ravens would respond with kicker Billy Cundiff making a 25-yard field goal. However, the Colts rebounded in the second quarter as quarterback Peyton Manning completed a 10-yard touchdown pass to wide receiver Austin Collie and a 3-yard touchdown pass to wide receiver Reggie Wayne. Following a scoreless third quarter, Baltimore's deficit increased in the fourth quarter as Stover gave Indianapolis a 33-yard field goal.

With the loss, the Ravens' season ended with an overall record of 10–8.

References

External links
 Official website
 NFL.com profile
 2009 Baltimore Ravens season at Pro Football Reference
 2009 Baltimore Ravens season at ESPN

Baltimore
Baltimore Ravens seasons
Baltimore Ravens
2000s in Baltimore